Naziabad may refer to:

 Nazi Abad, Tehran neighborhood
 Naziabad, Chaharmahal and Bakhtiari
 Naziabad, Manujan, Kerman Province
 Naziabad, Rafsanjan, Kerman Province